Neighbours (पड़ोसी Paṛōsī "neighbours") is a 2014 Bollywood horror film directed by Shyam Ramsay. The cast includes Arbaaz Ali Khan, Roushika Reikhi, Shakti Kapoor,  Gavie Chahal and Rufy Khan. The film was released on 14 March 2014. Neighbours was the first vampire film by the director, and the first Ramsay film to be set in a city, Mumbai, but Neighbours did not have a big theatrical release. Ramsay stated to the media: “My new film Neighbours is about a seemingly normal neighbour who turns out to be a vampire. We’ve cast a super-model Roushika Reikhi as a sexy vampire.”

Plot

Sanam is a horror buff, she has horror films and literature filling up her room, much to the annoyance of her family. Therefore, she is shocked to find out that vampires (who are on a killing spree in the city) have made their abode opposite her house.

Nobody believes Sanam, when she tells everyone that her neighbours are vampires. Not her family nor her friends, even her professor doesn't pay attention to her.

Cast
 Arbaaz Ali Khan as Aka
 Roushika Reikhi as Sanam
 Shakti Kapoor 
 Gavie Chahal as Inspector Vikrant
 Rufy Khan

Box office
The film was poorly received and was declared a box office disaster by Box Office India.

References

2014 horror films
2014 films
2010s Hindi-language films
Indian vampire films
Hindi-language horror films
Films directed by Shyam Ramsay